Dr Bell's School is a building located at 101 Great Junction Street, Leith, Scotland. The building was named after Scottish educationalist Andrew Bell (1753–1832), and is a Category B listed building of historical importance.

References

Buildings and structures in Leith
Category B listed buildings in Edinburgh